Genjing Records (simplified Chinese: 根茎唱片; traditional Chinese: 根莖唱片) is a vinyl-only independent record label in Beijing, China focused on contributing recordings of Chinese musicians into global scene and vinyl record culture.

Background
Since its inception in March 2011, Genjing Records has issued dozens of 7-inch singles, 10-inch EPs, and LPs from bands such as AM444, Demerit, Dear Eloise, Duck Fight Goose, the Fever Machine, Gum Bleed, Round Eye, Snapline, Wang Wen (罔聞) and Fanzui Xiangfa.  At its inception in 2011, the label was only conceived as a platform through which founder Nevin Domer's local Beijing hardcore band Fanzui Xiangfa (犯罪想法) could release and distribute their own recordings on vinyl records during a European tour with the German hardcore band SS20 . The success of this first release provided encouragement for developing Genjing Records into a full, vinyl-only independent record label in China. Nevin had also noticed that the renewed global interest in vinyl records he experienced during the Fanzu Xiangfa European Tour was also beginning to take root in China with a nascent record collecting community. Nevin then formally established the mission of Genjing Records as a means to facilitate the release of materials vinyl by Chinese bands and artists.

Current work
Genjing Records has since stabilized its mission statement first around creating relationships between China's DIY independent music communities and their international counterparts. This mission is primarily facilitated by the release of split 7-inch records in cooperation with global partner labels and subsequent multinational tours in which bands criss-cross each other's countries.  The label's international catalog includes releases by Cheap Stuff, Libyan Hit Squad, SS20, Sick Times, Tiny Ghosts and Tussle.

Genjing Records also seeks to more broadly support and facilitate other forms local outreach in China's various music communities. In August 2012, Genjing worked with one of the first expatriates involved in the mid-1990s Beijing punk scene, David O'Dell, to host a charity punk-rock show and auction in association with Half the Sky, a Chinese charitable organization dedicated to poor rural children. On August 19, 2012, Genjing Records was featured on DIY punk fanzine Maximumrocknroll's weekly radio show. On April 20, 2013, the label spearheaded Mainland China's participation in Record Store Day 2013.

In 2015, Genjing Records took the Melbourne band Primitive Calculators on tour in China performing at Split Works' Jue Festival in Beijing and Shanghai as well as club gigs in Xi’an, Yiwu and Wuhan. A documentary entitled "Which Way is China?" was made of the tour.

Nevin currently plays in the hardcore-punk band Struggle Session which has toured in China, Korea, Spain, Morocco, Brazil, Uruguay, Argentina, Chile, Peru, Colombia, Panama, and Australia.

Discography 
A full discography can be found on the label's bandcamp page.

References 

Rock record labels
World music record labels
Chinese independent record labels